Nathan Oystrick (born December 17, 1982) is a Canadian former professional ice hockey defenceman. Oystrick has previously played in the National Hockey League (NHL) with the Atlanta Thrashers, Anaheim Ducks and St. Louis Blues. He was originally drafted by the Thrashers in the seventh round, 198th overall, at the 2002 NHL Entry Draft. Oystrick was named head coach of the Humboldt Broncos on July 3, 2018, but quit the position less than six months later without explanation.

Playing career
Oystrick was drafted 198th overall in the 2002 NHL Entry Draft by the Atlanta Thrashers. On March 1, 2010, Oystrick, along with a conditional pick, was traded to the Anaheim Ducks in exchange for forward Evgeny Artyukhin. Oystrick played in three games with the Ducks to end the 2009–10 season before he was bought-out from the remainder of his contract on June 30, 2010.

On July 11, 2010, as a free agent, Oystrick signed a one-year contract with the St. Louis Blues. Oystrick began the 2010–11 season with the Blues' American Hockey League (AHL) affiliate, the Peoria Rivermen, but on November 3, the Blues recalled him from Peoria.

Oystrick signed a one-year contract as a free agent with the Phoenix Coyotes on July 6, 2011. In the 2011–12 season, Oysrick failed to make the Coyotes out of training camp and was reassigned to the team's affiliate, the Portland Pirates, for the duration of the year, scoring 43 points in 60 games.

On June 2, 2012, Oystrick signed a one-year contract with Kontinental Hockey League (KHL) side Lev Praha.

On November 13, 2014, Oystrick returned to North America, signing a professional try-out contract with the Springfield Falcons of the AHL in the 2014–15 season. With an eye to his post-playing career, in the following season, Oystrick signed a one-year contract in a playing and assistant coach role with the Elmira Jackals of the ECHL, an affiliate of the Buffalo Sabres on July 9, 2015.

Coaching career
During the 2015-16 off-season, Oystrick opted to end his professional playing career after 10 seasons, agreeing to an assistant coaching role with the Atlanta Gladiators on July 30, 2016.

On July 3, 2018, Oystrick was named the head coach of the Humboldt Broncos of the SJHL, replacing Darcy Haugan who was one of 16 people killed in the Humboldt Broncos bus crash.

On December 28th, 2018, Oystrick announced his resignation from the post of GM and coach. No reason was given, although a formal statement was expected to follow.

After leaving Humboldt, Oystrick went back to coaching in Colorado for the Colorado Academy Mustangs.

He is currently coaching for the Wausau Cyclones.

Career statistics

Awards and achievements

References

External links
 

1982 births
Living people
Anaheim Ducks players
Atlanta Thrashers draft picks
Atlanta Thrashers players
Chicago Wolves players
Elmira Jackals (ECHL) players
HC Lev Praha players
Sportspeople from Regina, Saskatchewan
Northern Michigan Wildcats men's ice hockey players
Peoria Rivermen (AHL) players
Portland Pirates players
St. Louis Blues players
Springfield Falcons players
Ice hockey people from Saskatchewan
Canadian ice hockey defencemen
AHCA Division I men's ice hockey All-Americans
Canadian expatriate ice hockey players in the United States
Canadian expatriate ice hockey players in the Czech Republic